Kollines is a village and a community in the municipal unit of Skiritida, Arcadia, Greece. It is situated in the green mountains near the border with Laconia. The community consists of the main village Kollines (population 263 in 2011) and the small villages Achouri (pop. 2) and Voutouchos (pop. 2). It is located 1 km east of Agia Varvara, 9 km south of Vlachokerasia and 25 km south of Tripoli.

Museum
The cultural association Friends of Skyritida opened a folklore museum in Kollines in 1997. Located in the primary school, the museum displays tools, clothes, photographs, and other print material to show how the older generations lived in the area.

Historical population

See also
List of settlements in Arcadia

References

External links
Local website 

Populated places in Arcadia, Peloponnese